Katsukawa Shun'ei (1762 – 13 December 1819) was a Japanese ukiyo-e artist.

Shun'ei's real surname was Isoda, and his father was a landlord named Isoda Jirōbei.

Shun'ei belonged to the Katsukawa school of artists; his earliest work dates to 1778. He designed mainly yakusha-e portraits of kabuki actors, and began producing ōkubi-e bust portraits as early as 1791. Together with Toyokuni I he illustrated the five-volume kabuki guide called Shibai kinmō zue ("Illustrated Guide to the Theatre") by Shikitei Sanba. He also made musha-e warrior prints and prints of sumo wrestlers. In  he took over as head from his teacher, Shunshō. Shun'ei and several other artists, including Utamaro and Toyokuni, were jailed and manacled for 50 days in 1804 for producing prints depicting Toyotomi Hideyoshi based on the Ehon taikōki ("Illustrated Chronicles of the Regent").

References

Works cited

Further reading

External links

18th-century Japanese artists
19th-century Japanese artists
Katsukawa school
Ukiyo-e artists